Mitch Stringer (born 1 November 1983), also known by the nickname of "The big fella", is a former Scotland international rugby league footballer who played as a

Playing career
He was brought up in Barnsley, and started his youth playing career at Sheffield Eagles after impressing with local amateur team Hoyland Vikings.

Stringer signed for Salford in 2005 from London Broncos. In 2006 he was re-signed by the Eagles for their successful bid for promotion from National League Two.
Stringer has also played as a professional for the London Broncos, Salford City Reds, Dewsbury Rams and the Sheffield Eagles where he became captain.

International
He also made eleven appearances for Scotland, scoring on 3 occasions. His first international game came against Papua New Guinea, where he began the match on the bench.
He represented Scotland at the 2013 Rugby League World Cup.

References

External links
(archived by web.archive.org) Salford Squad Profile: Mitch Stringer
Sheffield Eagles Website Homepage
(archived by web.archive.org) *

1983 births
Living people
Dewsbury Rams players
English people of Scottish descent
English rugby league players
London Broncos players
Rugby league players from Barnsley
Rugby league props
Salford Red Devils players
Scotland national rugby league team players
Sheffield Eagles captains
Sheffield Eagles players